Mohamed Sourour (11 March 1940 – 22 August 2022) was a Moroccan boxer. He competed at the 1968 Summer Olympics and the 1972 Summer Olympics. At the 1972 Summer Olympics, he lost to László Orbán of Hungary.

References

1940 births
2022 deaths
Moroccan male boxers
Olympic boxers of Morocco
Boxers at the 1968 Summer Olympics
Boxers at the 1972 Summer Olympics
Sportspeople from Marrakesh
Mediterranean Games bronze medalists for Morocco
Mediterranean Games medalists in boxing
Competitors at the 1971 Mediterranean Games
Lightweight boxers
20th-century Moroccan people
21st-century Moroccan people